Catherine Beattie (née Catherine McMillen, born 1981) is a Northern Irish international lawn & indoor bowler.

Bowls career
Beattie represented a combined Ireland under her maiden name of Catherine McMillen and won the singles gold medal at the Atlantic Bowls Championships. She also represented Northern Ireland during the 2014 Commonwealth Games before she was married. McMillen lost in the bronze medal play off in the singles at the 2014 Commonwealth Games to Colleen Piketh. In 2015 she won the singles gold medal at the Atlantic Bowls Championships. 

In 2017, she won three medals at the European Bowls Championships and one year later was selected as part of the Northern Ireland team for the 2018 Commonwealth Games on the Gold Coast in Queensland.

In 2020, she was selected for the 2020 World Outdoor Bowls Championship in Australia.

References

1981 births
Living people
Female lawn bowls players from Northern Ireland
Bowls players at the 2014 Commonwealth Games
Commonwealth Games competitors for Northern Ireland
Bowls European Champions